Kurlovo is a town in Gus-Khrustalny District of Vladimir Oblast, Russia, located  south of Vladimir, the administrative center of the oblast. Population:

History
It was founded in 1811 as a settlement near a glass factory and was originally called Kurlovsky. It was granted urban-type settlement status in 1927 and town status in 1998, at which time it was also given its present name.

Administrative and municipal status
Within the framework of administrative divisions, Kurlovo is directly subordinated to Gus-Khrustalny District. As a municipal division, the town of Kurlovo is incorporated within Gus-Khrustalny Municipal District as Kurlovo Urban Settlement.

References

Notes

Sources

Cities and towns in Vladimir Oblast
Monotowns in Russia